MVJ may refer to:
 VJ (media personality), a music or mobile video jockey
 MVJ College of Engineering, an engineering college in Bangalore, India
 Mavli Junction railway station, Rajasthan, India
 Marlboro Airport (Jamaica)